Barbullojë is a settlement in the Lezhë County, northwestern Albania. It is part of the former municipality, Shënkoll. At the 2015 local government reform it became part of the municipality Lezhë.

References

Populated places in Lezhë
Villages in Lezhë County